LVG or Luftverkehrsgesellschaft m.b.H. was a German aircraft manufacturer.

LVG may also refer to:

  or LVG, the Bavarian State Office for Survey and Geoinformation
 Livingston Energy Flight's ICAO airline code
 Livingston South railway station's rail station code
 Louis van Gaal or LvG, former footballer and manager
 Lexical Variant Generation (software), a software suite to perform natural language processing of medical documents
 Logical volume group, a component of logical volume management for computer storage

See also
LGV (disambiguation)
IVG (disambiguation)